Duygu Aynacı (born June 26, 1996) is a Turkish weightlifter competing in the 69 kg or 75 kg divisions.

Aynacı earned a quota spot for the 2016 Summer Olympics.

References

Living people
1996 births
Place of birth missing (living people)
Turkish female weightlifters
Weightlifters at the 2016 Summer Olympics
Olympic weightlifters of Turkey